Lake Iroquois is a freshwater reservoir located in west Loda, Illinois in Iroquois County,  from Onarga. The lake is 20–50 ft from Bayles Lake, the two lakes are separated by a road on the north side of Bayles Lake.

Fishing 
Lake Iroquois is annually stocked with many fish species. Fishermen will find a variety of fish including muskie, whitefish, carp, channel catfish, blue catfish, sunfish, largemouth bass, walleye, smallmouth bass, white catfish, striped bass, flathead catfish, crappie, bluegill, white bass, rock bass, bullhead, panfish, white perch here. Fishing is well known in this area being Lake Iroquois or Bayles Lake,

History

References

External links 
http://bayleslakehoa.com/
http://www.fishingworks.com/lakes/illinois/iroquois/buckley/bayles-lake/
http://www.hookandbullet.com/fishing-bayles-lake-onarga-il/
http://www.lakeiroquoisassoc.org/

Iroquois
Protected areas of Iroquois County, Illinois
Bodies of water of Iroquois County, Illinois